Bucculatrix kendalli is a moth in the family Bucculatricidae. It is found in North America, where it has been recorded from Texas. It was described by André Blanchard and Edward C. Knudson in 1985.

The larvae feed on Colubrina texensis. They mine the leaves of their host plant. Older larvae feed freely on the leaf.

References

Natural History Museum Lepidoptera generic names catalog

Bucculatricidae
Moths described in 1985
Moths of North America